Wattle Flat is a locality in the Australian state of South Australia located on the Fleurieu Peninsula.

References

Towns in South Australia